Townies and Hayseeds is a 1923 Australian film comedy from director Beaumont Smith. It is the fifth in his series about the rural family the Hayseeds.

It is considered a lost film.

Synopsis
City-dweller Pa Townie goes to the country for a holiday with his wife Ma and children Sydney, Melbourne, Adelaide, Brissy, Perth and Hobart. They stay with the Hayseed family, who they then invite to stay at their place in Potts Point. There is a romantic subplot where Pa Townie's daughter Adelaide (Lotus Thompson) is pursued by a returned serviceman, George, and an English "new chum" called "Choom".

Some of the satire included a "suicide club" at The Gap in Sydney, with Pa Townie trying to commit suicide, and a send up of former Prime Minister Billy Hughes.

Cast
George Edwards as Pa Townie
JP O'Neill as Dad Hayseed
Pinky Weatherly as Mum Hayseed
Ada S Claire as Ma Townie
Lotus Thompson as Adelaide Townie
W.J. Newman as Choom
Gordon Collingridge as George Fisher
Ena Aldworth
J Rayner
Freddie Tauchert
Gwen Gamble
Matthew Gamble
Jim Coleman
Gloria Lloyd Weatherly
Jack Tauchert
Harold Parkes

Production
The film was written, produced and sold within five weeks in May 1923 with shooting taking place in and around Sydney. Specific scenes and titles were added for the Melbourne and Adelaide release (e.g. Potts Point was changed to Toorak).

Reception
The titles of the movie received praise for their cleverness. Indeed, one reviewer though the titles were funnier than the actual sequences themselves.

The film was popular enough to lead to another in the series, Prehistoric Hayseeds.

References

External links
Townies and Hayseeds in the Internet Movie Database
Townies and Hayseeds at National Film and Sound Archive

1923 films
Films directed by Beaumont Smith
Lost Australian films
Australian silent feature films
Australian black-and-white films
Australian comedy films
1923 comedy films
1923 lost films
Lost comedy films
Silent comedy films